Against Infinity is a novel by Gregory Benford published in 1983.

Plot summary
Against Infinity is a novel in which colonists hunt the tunneling Aleph amid the terraforming of Ganymede.

Reception
Dave Pringle reviewed Against Infinity for Imagine magazine, and stated that "Benford is tackling his favourite theme of Humanity confronting the Other. There is no theme more fundamental to science fiction."

Dave Langford reviewed Against Infinity for White Dwarf #58, and stated that "This is an inconceivably alien quasi-machine, ever-changing, carefully not described in detail ('alabaster in parts and in other oozing an amber, watery light'): highly effective."

Colin Greenland reviewed Against Infinity for Imagine magazine, and stated that "The macho jaunt becomes thoroughly absorbing in the hands of Benford, who writes with equal attention to scientific plausibility and human emotion, and writes well."

Reviews
Review by Dan Chow (1983) in Locus, #267 April 1983
Review by Bob Collins (1983) in Fantasy Newsletter, #59 May 1983
Review by Algis Budrys (1983) in The Magazine of Fantasy & Science Fiction, July 1983
Review by Baird Searles (1983) in Isaac Asimov's Science Fiction Magazine, September 1983
Review by Tom Easton (1983) in Analog Science Fiction/Science Fact, September 1983
Review by Barrington J. Bayley (1984) in Foundation, #32 November 1984

References

1983 novels